Ramona Strugariu (born 6 August 1979) is a Romanian politician of REPER and previous member of USR PLUS/USR who has been serving as a Member of the European Parliament since 2019.

Political career
In parliament, Strugariu has been serving on the Committee on Civil Liberties, Justice and Home Affairs.

In addition to her committee assignments, Strugariu is part of the parliament's delegation to the Euronest Parliamentary Assembly. She is also a member of the European Parliament Intergroup on Anti-Corruption; the European Parliament Intergroup on LGBT Rights; and the MEPs Against Cancer group.

Political positions
In 2021, Strugariu joined seven other Romanian MEPs in co-signing a letter to Ursula von der Leyen and Maroš Šefčovič in which they call on the European Commission to stop the United Kingdom from holding EU nationals in immigration removal centers.

References

Living people
People from Bârlad
Freedom, Unity and Solidarity Party politicians
MEPs for Romania 2019–2024
Women MEPs for Romania
21st-century Romanian politicians
1979 births